Kornyn or Kornin may refer to the following places:

 Kornyn, Zhytomyr Oblast, urban-type settlement in Popilnia Raion, Zhytomyr Oblast, Ukraine
 Kornyn, Rivne Oblast, village in Rivne Raion, Rivne Oblast, Ukraine
 Stary Kornin, village in Poland